European route E16 is the designation of a main west-east road through Northern Ireland, Scotland, Norway and Sweden, from Derry to Gävle, via Belfast, Glasgow, Edinburgh, previously by ferry to Bergen, Voss, through the Gudvanga Tunnel and the Lærdal Tunnel (the world's longest road tunnel), Lærdal, over Filefjell to Fagernes, Hønefoss, Gardermoen and Kongsvinger. In Sweden, it passes Malung, Falun and ends in Gävle.

United Kingdom 
Northern Ireland
: Derry - 
:  - Antrim
Great Britain
In Northern Ireland, it follows the A6 from Derry to Randalstown, then the M22 and M2 to Belfast.  In Scotland, it follows the M8 from Glasgow to Edinburgh.

E16 meets the E1 and E18 in Belfast, the E5 in Glasgow, the E15 in Edinburgh. European routes are not signposted in the UK. There is no ferry any more between the United Kingdom and Norway.

Norway 
E16 is the main road between Norway's two largest cities Oslo and Bergen, and the only mountain pass between Oslo and Bergen that is rarely closed due to snowstorms and blizzards (it goes below the tree line). Outside winter, Route 7 is at least as popular between Oslo and Bergen, since it is shorter. There are some other options, such as the road through Hemsedal. E16 is narrow at many places in Norway, although upgrades are being built.

E16 meets the E39 in Bergen and the E6 at Gardermoen.

Sweden 
E16 runs together with the E45 between Torsby and Malung, and with the E4 in Gävle. There is no customs control at the Norway-Sweden border (but there is video surveillance), meaning that transports needing to be declared for customs, including most lorries, must be pre-cleared.

History 
The road number E16 was introduced in Norway in 1992, between Bergen and Oslo. The road Bergen–Oslo was called E68 in the old E-road system from 1950. In 1975, a new system was decided, where E16 only went through the United Kingdom (Londonderry–Edinburgh), and Bergen–Oslo was called E136. This was changed after several revisions of the agreement.

In 2011, it was decided to extend E16 from the Oslo region eastwards through Kongsvinger, Torsby, Malung, Borlänge to Gävle in Sweden. The signposting took place in the autumn of 2012.

A large road construction project was finished in 1992 when a new routing was opened almost all the way between Bergen and Voss. In 2003–2017, the road from Lærdal and over the mountain pass was improved with five new tunnels of over  length, improving road quality and winter predictability.

Gallery

References

External links 
 UN Economic Commission for Europe: Overall Map of E-road Network (2007)

16
1-0016
E016
1-0016
E016